Good clinical laboratory practice (GCLP) is a GxP guideline for laboratory samples from clinical studies.

Good clinical practice (GCP) does not define requirements for laboratories and good laboratory practice (GLP) focusses on pre-clinical analyses and not on human samples from clinical trials.  The Research Quality Association (RQA) suggested in 2003 a guideline to close the gap. Later the World Health Organization and the British Medicines and Healthcare products Regulatory Agency issued their own versions of a GCLP guideline.

Literature

 WHO Good Clinical Laboratory Practice (GCLP) 
 Stevens W. (2003) Good Clinical Laboratory Practice (GCLP): The need for a hybrid of Good Laboratory Practice and Good Clinical Practice guidelines/standards for medical testing laboratories conducting clinical trials in developing countries. Quality Assurance, 10: 83–89.
 Grant, Vanessa and Stiles, Tim, Research Quality Association (2003 and revised in 2012), Good Clinical Laboratory Practice

External links
 WHO Good Clinical Laboratory Practice (GCLP) (11 Oct 2010)
 MHRA guidance on the maintenance of regulatory compliance in laboratories that perform the analysis or evaluation of clinical trial samples (11 Oct 2010)
Research Quality Association (RQA)

Quality management
Good practice